Bishop Hugh Boyle, DD (13 December 1897 – 4 December 1986) was an Irish-born Catholic priest who served as a bishop in South Africa.

Biography
Boyle was born in Dunloy, Co. Antrim. Ireland, after working in Belfast in 1914 he resumed his education at Mungret College in Limerick. 
In 1920 he went to Propaganda College, Rome, earning a Doctorate in Theology in 1924

He was ordained a priest in Rome in 1923, by Cardinal Van Rossum. He moved to Port Elizabeth, South African in 1924, and worked as assistant editor of 'The Southern Cross'. Msgr Boyle served as Vicar Apostolic to Diocese of Port Elizabeth in 1948. He served as titular bishop of Bagai from 1948 to 1951.

Dr Boyle was appointed Bishop of Port Elizabeth, South Africa, on 11 January 1951 and translated to the See of Johannesburg 18 July 1954. He resigned as Bishop on 2 May 1976.

Bishop Boyle died on 12 December 1986 at Holy Cross Old Age Home, Lady Selbourne, Pretoria.

References

1897 births
1986 deaths
People from County Antrim
Irish expatriate Catholic bishops
20th-century Roman Catholic bishops in South Africa
Roman Catholic bishops of Johannesburg
Roman Catholic bishops of Port Elizabeth